The Migrant Worker Poetry Competition is an annual competition launched in 2014 that recognises outstanding poetry written by migrant workers in Singapore.

Poems are written by construction workers, domestic helpers and other migrant workers either in English or their native language.

The top three poets receive $500, $300 and $200 respectively. Winners are selected by a judging panel comprising playwrights and poets. Past judges include Haresh Sharma, Alvin Pang and Amanda Chong.

The competition was initiated by travel writer Shivaji Das and is organised by a team of volunteers and former participants. It is sponsored by the United States Embassy in Singapore.

A Malaysian edition was first held in Kuala Lumpur in 2015, featuring poetry by migrant workers and refugees. Similar competitions have also been launched in Hong Kong and Abu Dhabi.

History 
The Migrant Worker Poetry Competition was launched in 2014 when organiser Shivaji Das was a volunteer with non-profit organisation Transient Workers Count Too (TWC2). Das was inspired to showcase a different side of migrant workers and push back against stereotypes that society held of them.

The 2014 competition had 28 participants, all Bangladeshi workers. By 2016 it had grown to 70 participants. The 2017 competition received 107 submissions in 7 languages, and was the first time all three competition winners were women. In 2018, there were 120 participants.

The contest has since expanded to Malaysia, where there are a sizeable number of Rohingya refugees. 

In 2018, there were 120 participants.

Impact 
Many contest participants have gone on to create more literary and artistic work, participating and collaborating with fellow artists in events such as the Singapore Writers Festival.

Former winner, Zakir Hossain Khokon, co-edited a poetry anthology called Migrant Tales, which was launched at the 2016 competition finals.

Two film documentaries have been produced about the competition.

Former participants wrote, directed and performed a play at the 2017 competition finals, under the mentorship of judge and playwright Haresh Sharma.

Previous Winners

References 

Singaporean poetry
Poetry festivals in Asia
Annual events in Singapore
2014 establishments in Singapore